The Dublin adult football league is divided up into a tier system of 13 teams. These teams range from the top two Divisions one and two and eleven other divisions, 3, 4, 5, 6, 7, 8, 9, 10, 11 North and South. The winner of each league title goes on to qualify for the next highest ranking division.

AFL Division 3
The 2021 Division 3 Final, played on August 28th was won by St. Mary's Saggart who alongside runners up St Patrick's, Donabate will qualify for the Division 2 of the Dublin Adult Football League.

Roll of honour

AFL Division 4
The 2022 Division 4 League was won by Cuala who alongside runners up St Sylvester's will qualify for the Division 3 of the Dublin Adult Football League.

Roll of honour

AFL Division 5
The 2021 Division 5 Final, played on August 29th was won by Thomas Davis and who alongside runners up St Finians Swords will qualify for the Division 4 of the Dublin Adult Football League.

Roll of honour

AFL Division 6
The 2021 Division 6 Final, played on August 29th was won by Ballyboden St. Enda's and alongside runners up Fingal Ravens  will qualify for the Division 5 of the Dublin Adult Football League.

Roll of honour

AFL Division 7
In 2022, Garristown finished an impressive year as league champions where they were unbeaten throughout.

Roll of honour

AFL Division 8
The 2021 Division 8 Final, played on August 29th was won by St Kevin's Killians and alongside runners up Na Fianna will qualify for the Division 7 of the Dublin Adult Football League.

Roll of honour

AFL Division 9
The 2021 Division 9 Final, played on August 29th was won by Naomh Ólaf and alongside runners up Ballyboughal will qualify for the Division 8 of the Dublin Adult Football League.

Roll of honour

AFL Division 10
The 2021 Division 10 Final, played on August 29th was won by St. Colmcille's and alongside runners up Thomas Davis will qualify for the Division 9 of the Dublin Adult Football League.

Roll of honour

For the 2015 season, The Dublin County Board announced that Division 10 would be run on an All County basis.
The teams that contested AFL10 North County in 2015 were:
Castleknock, Crumlin, Cuala, Fingal Ravens, Na Fianna, Naomh Fionnbarra, Rosmini Gaels, Round Towers (L), St Brendan's, St Jude's, St Mark's, St Patrick's (P)

AFL Division 10S
The current Division Ten South County champions are St Kevins Killians, who made up for their defeat in the Junior E Championship Final by going through the whole division undefeated and now go on to qualify for the Division 9 of the Dublin Adult Football League.

Roll of honour

For the 2015 season, The Dublin County Board announced that Division 10 would be run on an All County Basis.

AFL Division 11N
The Dublin Division 11 North was won by St. Margarets who finished the year unbeaten

Roll of honour

 As AFL10 Mid County, which was discontinued after 2014 after the Dublin County Board announced that Division 10 would be run on an All County Basis.

AFL Division 11S
The Dublin County Board Division 11 South title was won by Cuala, who defeated St Finian's Newcastle 3-1 on a penalty shoot out after the game finished level 2-8 to 1-11 after extra time.

Roll of honour

{^ As AFL10 South City}

References

3